Nextome is an Italian company that does indoor positioning and navigation using iBeacons, which are Bluetooth Low Energy devices specified by Apple Inc. Nextome created a GPS-like experience with true position and turn-by-turn navigation that is supported by most phones operating on either Android or iOS. The features are provided through a software package (SDK) that improves user experience while connecting the online and offline worlds. The technology is patented in Europe, Singapore and US. Nextome works using phone sensors (Bluetooth, accelerometer and gyroscope). It catches the signals of the beacons in the environment and applies physical models and artificial intelligence algorithms to locate the phone. Calculation is performed on the phone, so Nextome has no need for a server infrastructure or a continuous internet connection.

History

Nextome was founded in December 2013 by Vincenzo Dentamaro, Domenico Colucci, Giangiuseppe Tateo and Marco Bicocchi Pichi. The software was developed for seven months before launching. The technology was validated by Microsoft. In May 2017, Nextome was accepted into the MassChallenge Ventures accelerator program based in Lausanne.

References

External links 
 

2014 software
Android (operating system) software
IOS software
Indoor positioning system